George Charles Beckley (March 5, 1787 – April 16, 1826) was an English captain, trader, and military adviser. He was one of the earliest foreigners to have a major impact in the Kingdom of Hawaii, where he eventually became a noble, and was one of the disputed creators of the Flag of Hawaii.

Life 
Beckley was born in England, possibly on March 5, 1787. He moved to Veracruz when his father was granted a privateering licence by the Mexican government.

In 1801, Beckley arrived in Honolulu, in what was then known to him as the Sandwich Islands. He sold his ship to local chiefs and took up residence in the kingdom. During his early years in the islands, Beckley acted as a privateer; he waylaid ships on the high seas and sold many of them to King Kamehameha I, who was attempting to consolidate his control over the kingdom. The Englishman eventually rose to some prominence in the court of Kamehameha, and Beckley became one of the king’s foreign advisors. On the occasion of the birth of the Princess Nāhiʻenaʻena at Keauhou, Kona, Hawaii, in 1815, Beckley was made a high chief by Kamehameha I so that he might, with "impunity enter the sacred precincts of the grass house". Beckley "present[ed] the royal infant with a roll of China silk, after which he went outside and fired a salute of thirteen guns in her honor.".

American missionary Hiram Bingham I mentioned in his diary that an "Englishman Beckley" occupied a position of some importance on the islands. Russian explorer Otto von Kotzebue recorded his meeting with Beckley on the island of Oahu in his journal. Beckley continued to go to sea often, and was a major participator in the Sino-Hawaiian sandalwood trade. He organized trips to Fanning Island to hunt the valuable Hawaiian monk seal, and on occasion returned to privateering.

In 1816, Beckley became the first commander of Honolulu Fort, a military garrison erected on the waterfront of Honolulu by King Kamehameha I and Prime Minister Kalanimoku. The garrison was erected in response to attempts by Russian agent Georg Anton Schäffer to build a fort on Oahu. Measuring three hundred yards on one side, the coral-rock structure was mounted with about forty guns including numerous cannons and was garrisoned with Hawaiian soldiers trained by Kamehameha I. Beckley implemented the tradition of wearing Western uniforms, gaining the name "Humehume" (cover up) by the Hawaiians. Previously the native soldiers only wore the traditional malo (loincloths).

Beckley died on April 16, 1826, in Honolulu. According to the journals of American missionary Levi Chamberlain:
He was buried agreeably to his wish within his own enclosure. A vault was dug within the walls of an unfinished house; and inclosed [sic] with bricks & lined with mats. A part of the church buryal [sic] service was read by Mr. Bingham, who afterwards made a short address to the bystanders both in English & Hawaii & closed with prayer.

His remains were later removed to the Oahu Cemetery where many of his descendants are also interred. A gravestone corresponding to Beckley's lifespan, although not his most recognized name, bears the inscription "Fredrick Beckley March 5, 1787 Died 1827".

Creation of the Hawaiian flag 

In 1801, the modern Union Jack replaced the former King James Union Jack. Inspired by the many British vessels that visited Hawaii, King Kamehameha commissioned a flag of his own. The exact designer of the flag is disputed between Captain Beckley and Alexander Adams, another of the British captains under Kamehameha's service. The tradition of the Beckley family maintained that Captain Beckley designed the Hawaiian flag in 1806 or 1807 and used it in his trading missions between Hawaii, China and Mexico. According to historian Albert Pierce Taylor, whose wife was a descendant of the English sea captain, he "was undoubtedly the originator of the flag of Hawaii". His journal or logbook was lost by his descendants during the 19th-century, although family records claimed that the flag was fashioned into a frock used by his children and passed down as a family heirloom. The final flag had a combination of British and American flag elements, and had one stripe for each of the Hawaiian islands. It was intended to show the neutrality of the Hawaiian Kingdom during the war between the two vital, English speaking trade partners. King Kamehameha was greatly impressed by the flag and had it flown above his residence. The flag went on to become the flag for Kingdom of Hawaii and later the State of Hawaii.

Family and children 
In 1813, he married Elizabeth Ahia (1797–1854), a Hawaiian high chiefess. She was the daughter of Kahakuʻi-i-ka-waiea, high priest of the heiau of Puʻu o Maneʻo at Honokane, Kohala, and was granddaughter of Kahānui who with his twin sister Kahaʻopulani hid and reared Kamehameha during his infancy,
When her father was charged with building Kamehameha's war canoes, Ahia served as the religious moa (mascot) for the blessing of the fleet. Known to be a haughty woman, she accompanied Beckley on his many trips to sea and dressed in both Spanish and Hawaiian fashions. She was required to "kolokolo" or crawl in the presence of her husband after Beckley's royal elevation in 1815. Their hapa-haole (part-Hawaiian) descendants were regarded as members of the aliʻi (noble) class during the Hawaiian monarchy; they went on to intermarry and form different families of their own. Their six or seven children included:

William Charles Malulani Beckley (1815–1871), who was brought up alongside Kauikeaouli, the future Kamehameha III. He married three times; his first wife was an unnamed pure Hawaiian chiefess who died childless, his second wife was Kahinu, daughter of Hoʻolulu. His third wife was Mary Ann Kameʻehiwa Tressilyan Beckley, considered "The Rose of the Pacific". His children with Kahinu included Frederick William Kahapula Beckley Sr., Maria Beckley Kahea, and George Charles Moʻoheau Beckley, and their grandson was Frederick William Kahapula Beckley Jr. Beckley Street in Kalihi, Honolulu is named after Frederick (William’s son).
George Frederick Hoapili Beckley (1822–1868).
Maria Kaiponui Kaipoliilii Beckley, (1817–1887), who married to Kamakahonu and later Edmund (or Henry) Kistler, who married her on her deathbed. Kistler ran off to San Francisco, stealing her fortune including Captain Beckley's diary and personal records.
Localia Beckley, born 1818.
Mary Kekahimoku Kolimoalani Beckley (1820–1850), who married Abram Henry Fayerweather. Their two daughters were Julia Fayerweather Afong, the matriarch of the Chinese-Hawaiian Afong family, and Mary Jane Kekulani Davison, later Mrs, Montano, who was the mother of Emma Ahuena Davison, wife of Albert Pierce Taylor (mentioned above).
Hannah Beckley.
Emmeline Maria Guadaloupe Beckley (1825–1850), who was named in honor of Guadalupe Victoria by the Mexican president's daughter. She married on July 23, 1842, to American ship chandler George Ward Punchard (1816–1852) and had descendants.

References

Bibliography

Further reading

External links 

1787 births
1826 deaths
British expatriates in the Hawaiian Kingdom
English privateers
Flag designers
Hawaiian nobility
Hawaiian Kingdom people
Hawaiian Kingdom politicians
Nobility of the Americas